Allahabad Rural District is in Zarach District of Yazd County, Yazd province, Iran. At the National Census of 2006, its population was 3,475 in 927 households. There were 4,991 inhabitants in 1,249 households at the following census of 2011. At the most recent census of 2016, the population of the rural district was 5,908 in 1,547 households. The largest of its 38 villages was Allahabad, with 5,573 people.

References 

Yazd County

Rural Districts of Yazd Province

Populated places in Yazd Province

Populated places in Yazd County